Pisanianura is a genus of sea snails, marine gastropod mollusks in the family Laubierinidae.

Species
 † Pisanianura borsoni (Bellardi, 1873) 
 † Pisanianura craverii (Bellardi, 1873) 
 Pisanianura grimaldii (Dautzenberg, 1899)
 † Pisanianura inflata (Brocchi, 1814) 
 † Pisanianura spiralis (P. Marshall, 1918) 
Synonyms
 Pisanianura breviaxis (Kuroda & Habe, 1961): synonym of Laminilabrum breviaxe Kuroda & Habe, 1961

References

 Rovereto G. (1899). Prime ricerche sinonimiche sui generi dei Gasteropodi. Atti della Società Ligustica di Scienze Naturale e Geografiche, Genova 10: 101-110

External links
 Bellardi, L. (1873). I molluschi dei terreni terziarii del Piemonte e della Liguria. Parte I. Cephalopoda, Pteropoda, Heteropoda. Gasteropoda (Muricidae et Tritonidae). Stamperia Reale, Torino, 264 pp., 15 pl
 Laws, C. R. (1944). The molluscan faunule at Pakaurangi Point, Kaipara. No. 3. Transactions of the Royal Society of New Zealand. 73: 297–312, pls. 43-45
 Warén, A.; Bouchet, P. (1990). Laubierinidae and Pisanianurinae (Ranellidae), two new deep-sea taxa of the Tonnoidea (Gastropoda: Prosobranchia). Veliger. 33(1): 56-102

Laubierinidae